Courtney Leonard Brown (born February 10, 1984) is a former American football cornerback in the National Football League (NFL) for the Dallas Cowboys and New York Giants. He played college football at Cal Poly San Luis Obispo.

Early years
Brown attended Saint Mary's College High School, where he played as a cornerback and wide receiver. He received All-league honors at defensive back as a senior. In track, he qualified for the state's finals. He was a four-year honor-roll member.

He accepted a football scholarship from California Polytechnic State University, a Division I-AA school. In 2002, he started as a true freshman at wide receiver and caught 9 passes for 139 yards (15.4-yard average). In 2003, he was moved to left cornerback where he started 6 out of the 8 games he appeared in, finishing with 16 tackles, 2 interceptions and one pass defensed. He missed the last 3 games with an ankle sprain.

In 2004, he sustained a season ending left knee injury in the season opener against Humboldt State University. In 2005, he started at right cornerback, intercepting 7 passes (tied school record), breaking up 12 passes and making 44 tackles.

As a senior in 2006, he played in 11 games, registering 51 tackles (1.5 for loss), one interception and 7 passes defensed. He allowed only 29 receptions and no touchdowns from opponents. He finished his college career with 31 starts, 111 tackles (1.5 for loss), 10 interceptions, 22 passes defensed and 9 receptions for 139 yards.

Professional career

Dallas Cowboys
Brown was selected by the Dallas Cowboys in the seventh round (212th overall) of the 2007 NFL Draft. The team decided to keep him instead of Abram Elam during the last cuts of the preseason on September 2, which was a decision they would later come to regret. On September 26, he suffered a left biceps injury in practice and was inactive for 5 games. He played in 8 games and had 2 defensive tackles, 4 special teams tackles and one fumble recovery.

In 2008, he was switched to strong safety, recording one start, 6 tackles and 3 special teams tackles. He was waived on September 5, 2009, because of his tackling limitations.

New York Giants
After spending the 2009 season out of football, Brown signed a future contract with the New York Giants on January 6, 2010. He was placed on the injured reserve list with an ankle injury on September 4, 2010. He wasn't re-signed after his contract expired.

References

External links
Cowboys learning a lot about Courtney Brown

1984 births
Living people
Players of American football from Berkeley, California
African-American players of American football
American football wide receivers
American football cornerbacks
American football safeties
Cal Poly Mustangs football players
Dallas Cowboys players
New York Giants players
21st-century African-American sportspeople
20th-century African-American people